Jennifer Rockwell (born 28 May 1983) is an Italian athlete specializing in 400-meter hurdles. She participated at the 2013 World Championships in Athletics.

Achievements

References

External links
 

1983 births
Italian female hurdlers
World Athletics Championships athletes for Italy
Living people
People from Tooele, Utah